Olivera Marković (née Đorđević; ; 3 May 1925 – 2 July 2011) was a Serbian actress. She appeared in 170 films and television shows between 1946 and 2005. She won the Golden Arena for Best Actress in 1964 for her role in Službeni položaj.

Life
Olivera married twice:

Rade Marković (5 November 1945 – 15 November 1964): They divorced after nineteen years of marriage. They had one child during that marriage (a son named Goran, born 24 August 1946). Rade died on 10 September 2010 at the age of 88. She died ten months later.
Dušan Bulajić (date unknown – 3 June 1995) Her second marriage. They were married until his death at the age of 63.

She died in 2011 at the age of eighty-six of cancer.

Selected filmography

Film

Television

References

External links

1925 births
2011 deaths
20th-century Serbian actresses
21st-century Serbian actresses
Actresses from Belgrade
Serbian film actresses
Serbian television actresses
Yugoslav actresses
Golden Arena winners
Laureates of the Ring of Dobrica